Oxford railway station is a mainline railway station, one of two serving the city of Oxford, England. The station is managed by Great Western Railway, and also served by CrossCountry and Chiltern Railways trains. Immediately to the north is Sheepwash Channel Railway Bridge over the Sheepwash Channel.

History

The Great Western Railway (GWR) opened to Oxford on 12 June 1844 with a terminus station in what is now Western Road, Grandpont. For just over two years, trains from Oxford to Banbury started at Grandpont, and had to reverse at Millstream Junction in order to continue their journey.

The ORR line included a new through station in Park End Street, so when this opened with the extension of the line from Banbury to Birmingham on 1 October 1852, the original Grandpont terminus was closed to passenger services. The old station at Grandpont became a goods depot, but was closed completely on 26 November 1872, the day that the broad gauge tracks were removed north of Didcot.

Major subsequent changes were removal of the last  gauge tracks in 1872 and of the train shed in 1890–1. The station was substantially rebuilt by the Western Region of British Railways in 1971, further improvements being carried out during 1974 including the provision of a new travel centre, and the new main building and footbridge were added in 1990 by Network SouthEast.

Planning permission was granted for the expansion to support the proposed Chiltern Railways service to London Marylebone  and the service was subsequently launched on 12 December 2016. Meanwhile, Oxford City Council, Oxfordshire County Council and Network Rail have developed a masterplan for further development of the station. Construction of an additional platform has been proposed.

Flood remediation work south of the station at Hinksey saw services at the station curtailed & replaced by buses to/from Didcot Parkway in July and August 2016. This allowed the trackbed to be raised by 2 feet (0.65 m) and new culverts installed to reduce the impact of flooding from the nearby River Thames upon the railway (which has caused service interruptions on several occasions in recent years). Concurrent bridge repair work at Hanborough and signalling alterations at Banbury was also carried out over this period. The £18 million scheme was completed on 15 August 2016.

The station has always been busy. In addition to current services, formerly there were others over the Wycombe Railway, Oxford, Witney and Fairford Railway, and Blenheim and Woodstock Branch Line.  Through trains from the north to the Southern Railway also typically changed locomotives at Oxford.

On 1 October 1951 British Railways closed Rewley Road station to passengers and transferred its services to this station.

South of the station immediately west of the railway tracks is Osney Cemetery, established in 1848 just before the current station site. Nearby is the site of the former Osney Abbey.

Station masters

James F. Relton 1853 - 1863 (afterwards station master at Newport)
Alfred Jordan 1863 - 1866
William M. Beauchamp 1866 - 1868 (formerly station master at Worcester)
James William Gibbs, 1868 - 1880 (formerly station master at Warminster)
Mr. Newsom 1880 - 1883 (formerly station master at Taplow)
Robert Davis 1883  - 1905 (formerly station master at Plymouth North Road)
R. Brooker 1905 - 1918
William Frederick Knutton 1918 - 1924 (afterwards station master at Reading)
H.C. Foster 1924  - 1927 (formerly station master at Penzance)
Frank Buckingham 1927 - 1941
F.C. Price 1941 - ???? (formerly station master at Gloucester)
C.H. Swancutt 1947- 1950  (afterwards station master at Birmingham Snow HIll)
James Miller 1951 - 1960 (formerly station master at Newbury)

Plans

Further expansion
In November 2009 it was announced that Oxford station would be expanded. A £10 million joint development between Network Rail and Oxfordshire County Council would create a new platform on part of the station’s long-stay car park. The new platform (south of platform 1) would allow trains to arrive and depart from the same track and reduce the need for empty trains to be shunted around the station. Currently, in busy periods trains can be kept waiting outside of the station for a platform to become available.

A new covered footbridge would also be built over Botley Road to link the station building with the new platform, replacing the existing footbridge to the car park. The new platform was to have been brought into use during 2011, and was to be part of the city and county councils' West End Area Action Plan for the western part of the city centre, which also considers other rail projects such as Evergreen 3 and the Paddington–Oxford electrification.

Chiltern Railways has raised the possibility of developing a service between Oxford and the Cowley branch line.

Project Evergreen 3

Services to Oxford were planned to start in Spring 2016, although locals objected to the extra noise that would be caused. Network Rail completed the final stages of infrastructure work in the Wolvercote Tunnel and Peartree areas in September 2016, and Chiltern Railways began services from Oxford to Oxford Parkway on 11 December 2016.

East West Rail

Extension to Cambridge is planned, but not scheduled.

Services

The stopping trains mainly originate here (a small number come from ), however some fast trains continue to and from Worcester and Hereford.

Chiltern Railways run two fast trains per hour to  via . These also call at the nearby .

See also
 Oxford Down Carriage Sidings, to the north of the station

Notes

References

Bibliography

External links

 Chiltern Railways Evergreen 3 project

1852 establishments in England
Railway stations in Great Britain opened in 1852
Buildings and structures completed in 1990
Railway station
Former Great Western Railway stations
Railway stations in Oxfordshire
DfT Category B stations
Railway stations served by Chiltern Railways
Railway stations served by CrossCountry
Railway stations served by Great Western Railway
Railway station
East West Rail